Sasi Shanker (1957 – 10 August 2016) was an Indian film director. He directed one Tamil film and ten Malayalam films. He won the National Film Award for Best Film on Other Social Issues in 1993 for his film Naaraayam. He died on 10 August 2016.

Filmography

References

External links

1957 births
2016 deaths
Tamil-language film directors
20th-century Indian film directors
Malayalam film directors
21st-century Indian film directors